Elachista herbigrada is a moth of the family Elachistidae. It is found in North America, where it has been recorded from Alberta, Utah, Colorado and Arizona.

The wingspan is 8.5-9.5 mm. The forewings are fuscous, the bases of the scales whitish. The hindwings are pale grey. Adults have been recorded on wing from July to August.

References

herbigrada
Moths described in 1925
Moths of North America